The Nokia E66 is a slider smartphone in the Nokia Eseries range, a S60 platform third edition device with slide action targeting business users. It is a successor to the Nokia E65 with which it shares many features.

E66 has similar features to the Nokia E71 handset, but lacks sufficient battery capacity for all day use and does not have the full QWERTY, however the E66 is smaller in size and weighs less. The E66 also includes an accelerometer and new animations and transition effects, which are lacking in the E71.

Features

Quad band GSM / GPRS / EDGE: GSM 850 / 900 / 1800 / 1900
 Dual band UMTS / HSDPA: UMTS 900 / 2100
 FM radio 87.5–108 MHz with Visual Radio
 3.2-megapixel camera (2048 × 1536 pixels) with  Self-portrait mirror, autofocus and LED flash
 110 MB Internal user storage, support up to 8 GB MicroSDHC memory card
 Video: 320 × 240 (QVGA) at 15 frames/s, 176 × 144 at 15 frames/s (QCIF)
 Front-facing camera for video call
 2.36 inch QVGA (320 × 240) screen
 Modes: Define user preset standby screens for different times of the day
 Accelerometer and Light sensor
 OS: S60 3rd Edition, Feature Pack 1 (Version 3.1), with Symbian OS Version 9.2
 In-Box Colours: grey steel, white steel, black steel and red steel

The 2.5 mm (3/32") audio port is not suitable for traditional 3.5 mm (1/8") headphones plugs.

The microUSB port cannot be used to charge the mobile.

Operating times

Talk time: Up to 3.4 hours (3G), 7.5 hours (GSM)
Standby time: Up to 14 days (3G), 11 days (GSM)

Firmware history
Dial *#0000# to Check firmware version
 
 100.07.81/100.07.76: Build date 16-06-2008 (Default firmware upon release)
 102.07.81:  Build date 12-07-2011
 110.07.126: Build date 03-10-2011
 200.21.118: Build date 26-11-2011 
 210.21.007: Build date 27-02-2011
 300.21.012: Build date 18-06-2011
 400.21.013: Build date 24-10-2011
 410.21.010: Build date 08-02-2011
 500.21.009: Build date 02-06-2011
 501.21.001: Build date 10-08-2011
 510.21.009: Build date 19-03-2011

Bundled software

 Adobe PDF
 Adv. Call Manager
 Barcode Reader
 Chat and instant messaging
 Dictionary
 Download! (Replaced by Ovi store on later versions)
 Email for Nokia
 File Manager
 Flash Lite 3.0
 Global Race – Raging Thunder
 Internet Radio
 Java MIDP 2.0
 MfE (Mail for Exchange)
 Multiscanner
 Nokia Maps (with 3 months of turn-by-turn navigation mode trial)
 Nokia Search
 Nokia browser
 PDF Viewer
 Quickoffice (Quickword, Quickpoint, Quicksheet)
 Sports Tracker
 WiPresenter
 Wireless Keyboard
 World Mate
 ZIP Manager

See also 

 Nokia Eseries
 List of Nokia products

References

External links 

 Nokia E66 – Product page
 Nokia E66 – Device details

Mobile phones introduced in 2008
Nokia ESeries
Mobile phones with infrared transmitter
Slider phones